Niccolo Lamberti (late 14th century) was an Italian painter of the Florentine school, active in 1382.

He was a pupil of the Orcagna, and painted in company with Jacopo (?) in the palace at Volterra a fresco representing the Annunciation" with Saints. His son Pietro was active in Venice.

References

14th-century Italian painters
Italian male painters
Trecento painters
Painters from Florence
Year of death unknown
Year of birth unknown